The Shire of South Gippsland was a local government area about  south-southeast of Melbourne, the state capital of Victoria, Australia.

History

Originally part of the Alberton Road District, South Gippsland was first incorporated as a shire on 16 February 1894.

On 2 December 1994, the Shire of South Gippsland was abolished, and along with the Shire of Mirboo and parts of the Shires of Korumburra and Woorayl, was merged into the new Shire of South Gippsland.

Wards

South Gippsland was divided into three ridings, each of which elected three councillors:
 West Riding
 Central Riding
 East Riding

Towns and localities

* Council seat.

Population

* Estimate in the 1958 Victorian Year Book.

References

External links
 Victorian Places - South Gippsland Shire

South Gippsland
Gippsland (region)